The 2008 WAFF Women's Futsal Championship was the inaugural women's futsal championship for the West Asian Football Federation. The tournament was held in Jordan.

Group stage

Group A

Group B

Knockout stage

Semi-finals

3rd Place

Final

Awards 

 Most Valuable Player
 Top Scorer
 Fair-Play Award

External links
2008 WAFF Women's Futsal Championship results

2008 in Asian football
WAFF
2008
2008
2008–09 in Jordanian football
2008–09 in Iranian futsal
2008–09 in Syrian football
2008–09 in Palestinian football
2008–09 in Lebanese football
2008–09 in Iraqi football
2008–09 in Kuwaiti football